Germain Hughes (born 15 November 1996) is an Anguillan footballer who plays as a defensive midfielder for Roaring Lions FC and the Anguilla national football team.

Club career
Hughes started his career at local side Salsa Ballers before accepting a scholarship at the University of the West Indies. During his studies he played in Barbados for UWI Blackbirds. In 2017 he was invited to the 2018 MLS Caribbean Combine, watched by MLS clubs, but did not earn a contract. After a year in England, he moved to Gibraltar to play for Leo on 16 June 2019. However, the club folded before the season started, leaving Hughes without a club. He then came back to Anguilla and joined the Roaring Lions FC, in the Anguilla Football League. Winning two championship with them in 2020 and 2021 before moving back to England in 2022. He then went on trials in England before joining the Coggeshall Town FC at the end of the 2022 season.

International career
Hughes made his senior international debut on 10 October 2012 in a 2–0 away defeat to Saint Kitts and Nevis in Caribbean Cup qualification, becoming the youngest player to represent Anguilla at 15 years old.

Career statistics

International

References

External links

Profile at ESPN FC

1996 births
Living people
Anguillan footballers
UWI Blackbirds FC players
Heather St John's F.C. players
Association football defenders
Leo F.C. players
Roaring Lions FC players
Anguilla international footballers
Anguilla under-20 international footballers
Anguilla youth international footballers
Salsa Ballers FC players